Adamsburg is a borough in Westmoreland County, Pennsylvania, United States. The population was 144 at the time of the 2020 federal census. 

The borough was named for John Quincy Adams, sixth President of the United States.

Geography
Adamsburg is located at  (40.310501, -79.654423).

Demographics

At the 2000 census there were 221 people, 84 households, and 63 families living in the borough. The population density was 838.3 people per square mile (328.2/km²). There were 92 housing units at an average density of 349.0 per square mile (136.6/km²).  The racial makeup of the borough was 100.00% White. Hispanic or Latino of any race were 0.90%.

Of the 84 households 33.3% had children under the age of 18 living with them, 54.8% were married couples living together, 15.5% had a female householder with no husband present, and 25.0% were non-families. 21.4% of households were one person and 7.1% were one person aged 65 or older. The average household size was 2.40 and the average family size was 2.75.

The age distribution was 18.6% under the age of 18, 11.3% from 18 to 24, 25.3% from 25 to 44, 24.0% from 45 to 64, and 20.8% 65 or older. The median age was 42 years. For every 100 females, there were 90.5 males. For every 100 females age 18 and over, there were 81.8 males.

The median household income was $38,750 and the median family income  was $45,000. Males had a median income of $29,000 versus $18,958 for females. The per capita income for the borough was $17,172. About 9.4% of families and 10.4% of the population were below the poverty line, including 9.1% of those under the age of eighteen and none of those sixty five or over.

Surrounding communities
 Jeannette
 Arona
 Irwin
 Penn

Notable person
Bill Bishop, baseball player

References

External links
 Adamsburg and Community Volunteer Fire Department official website

Boroughs in Westmoreland County, Pennsylvania
Populated places established in 1841
Pittsburgh metropolitan area
1841 establishments in Pennsylvania